The grooved carpet shell, or Palourde clam, Ruditapes decussatus, or Venerupis decussatus, is a clam (bivalve mollusc) in the family Veneridae. It is distributed worldwide and due to its ecological and economic interest has been proposed as a bioindicator.

This species is one of the most popular and profitable mollusc of lagoonal and coastal sites in the Mediterranean, where it was collected for a long time as food. It is consumed fresh and canned.

Description
The shell is broadly oval to quadrate with the umbones distinctly anterior. The posterior hinge line is straight, the posterior margin truncate, and the anterior hinge line grades into the down-sloping anterior margin. It is prominent posteriorly, where the shell is conspicuously decussate. The surface has a sculpture of fine concentric striae and bolder radiating lines. Growth stages are clear. The lunule and escutcheon are poorly defined. Each valve has three cardinal teeth: the centre one in the left valve, and centre and posterior in right are bifid. The pallial line and adductor scars are distinct. The pallial sinus is U-shaped, not extending beyond the midline of the shell, but reaching a point below the posterior part of the ligament. The lower limb of the sinus is distinct from the pallial line for the whole of its length. The inner surfaces of the shell are glossy white, often with yellow or orange tints, and with a bluish tinge along the dorsal edge. The overall color is cream, yellowish, or light brown, often with darker markings.
<div align=center>
Ruditapes decussatus
Right and left valve of the same specimen:

</div align=center>

<div align=center>
Ruditapes decussatus floridus
Right and left valve of the same specimen:

</div align=center>

Location
Despite improper management in the past, some regions in the Atlantic coast of the Iberian Peninsula, including Portugal's Algarve, Spain's Galicia and of the Mediterranean basin, as well as Ireland, currently have solid populations of Ruditapes decussatus.

Uses
Ruditapes decussatus is cultured from the Atlantic coast of France, Spain, Portugal and in the Mediterranean basin. It is often grown with other bivalves (Venerupis pullastra, Venerupis rhomboides, Venerupis aurea, Dosinia exoleta and Tellina incarnata). Their main predators are shore crabs (Carcinus maenas); starfish (Asterias rubens and Marthasterias glacialis); gastropods (Natica sp.); and birds (Larus sp). An individual Carcinus maenas (6.5 cm width) can consume 5 or 6 clams per day. Marine aquaculture production of grooved carpet shell in 2003 was 3,007 t in Portugal, which excludes non-aquaculture harvesting of the species.

Between 1997 and 2001 total aquaculture production varied between 3,700 and 4,900 tonnes, from five countries. Most was produced by Portugal but France and Spain have also been significant producers; however, the contribution from France is now much lower than before; in 1995 it was by far the leading producer with nearly 5,200 tonnes but in 2004 it produced only 475 tonnes. Global production seems to be declining; in 2004 it was only 2,700 tonnes but the United Kingdom had appeared as a minor producer.

It is consumed fresh and canned.

References

Bibliography   
  Garcia, F. – 1993. Interprétation des stries valvaires pour l'évaluation de la croissance de Ruditapes decussatus L. Oceanologica Acta . 16: 199–203..  
  Poppe, G. T. & Goto, Y. – 1991. European seashells. Vol 1 (Polyplacophora, Caudofoveata, Solenogastra, Gastropoda).Verlag Christa Hemmen .  
  Rodriguez-Moscoso, E & Arnaiz, R – 1998. Gametogenesis and energy storage in a population of the grooved carpet-shell clam, Tapes decussatus (Linne, 1787), in northwest Spain. Aquaculture. . vol. 162, no. 1–2, pp. 125–139 ..  
  Xie, Qiushi & Burnell, GM – 1994. A comparative study of the gametogenic cycles of the clams Tapes philippinarum (A. Adams & Reeve 1850) and Tapes decussatus (Linnaeus) on the south coast of Ireland. Journal of Shellfish Research. . vol. 13, no. 2, pp. 467–472..

Aquaculture
Veneridae
Marine molluscs of Europe
Commercial molluscs
Molluscs described in 1758
Taxa named by Carl Linnaeus